The works of Philo, a first-century Alexandrian philosopher, are mostly allegorical interpretations of the Torah (known in the Hellenic world as the Pentateuch), but also include histories and comments on philosophy. Most of these have been preserved in Greek by the Church Fathers; some survive only through an Armenian translation.

List of extant works
Some 50 works by Philo have survived, and he is known to have written some 20 to 25 further works which have been lost.
The following list gives conventional Latin and English titles and abbreviations commonly used in reference works.

Commentaries on the Pentateuch
Philo's commentary on the Pentateuch is usually classified within three genres.

Quaestiones 
The Quaestiones explain the Pentateuch catechetically, in the form of questions and answers ("Zητήματα καὶ Λύσεις, Quæstiones et Solutiones"). Only the following fragments have been preserved: abundant passages in Armenian – possibly the full work – in explanation of Genesis and Exodus, an old Latin translation of a part of the "Genesis," and fragments from the Greek text in Eusebius, in the "Sacra Parallela," in the "Catena," and also in Ambrosius. The explanation is confined chiefly to determining the literal sense, although Philo frequently refers to the allegorical sense as the higher.

Allegorical commentary 
Νόμων Ἱερῶν Ἀλληγορίαι, or "Legum Allegoriæ," deals, so far as it has been preserved, with selected passages from Genesis. According to Philo's original idea, the history of primal man is here considered as a symbol of the religious and moral development of the human soul. This great commentary included the following treatises:
"Legum allegoriae," books i.-iii., on Gen. ii. 1-iii. 1a, 8b-19 (on the original extent and contents of these three books and the probably more correct combination of i. and ii.)
"De cherubim," on Gen. iii. 24, iv. 1;
"De sacrificiis Abelis et Caini," on Gen. iv. 2–4;
"De eo quod deterius potiori insidiatur";
"De posteritate Caini," on Gen. iv. 16-25
"De gigantibus," on Gen. vi. 1–4;
"Quod Deus sit immutabilis," on Gen. vi. 4-12
"De Agricultura Noë," on Gen. ix. 20; 
"De Plantatione," on Gen. ix. 20b; 
"De Ebrietate," on Gen. ix. 21
"Resipuit; Noë, seu De Sobrietate," on Gen. ix. 24–27;
"De Confusione Linguarum," on Gen. xi. 1–9;
"De Migratione Abrahami," on Gen. xii. 1–6;
"Quis Rerum Divinarum Heres Sit," on Gen. xv. 2–18;
"De Congressu Quærendæ Eruditionis Gratia," on Gen. xvi. 1–6;
"De Profugis," on Gen. xvi. 6–14;
"De Mutatione Nominum," on Gen. xvii, 1-22;
"De Somniis," book i., on Gen. xxviii. 12 et seq., xxxi. 11 et seq. (Jacob's dreams); "De Somniis," book ii., on Gen. xxxvii. 40 et seq. (the dreams of Joseph, of the cupbearer, the baker, and Pharaoh). Philo's three other books on dreams have been lost. The first of these (on the dreams of Abimelech and Laban) preceded the present book i., and discussed the dreams in which God Himself spoke with the dreamers, this fitting in very well with Gen. xx. 3.

Exposition of the Law 
Philo wrote a systematic work on Moses and his laws, which is usually prefaced by the treatise "De Opificio Mundi." The Creation is, according to Philo, the basis for the Mosaic legislation, which is in complete harmony with nature ("De Opificio Mundi," § 1 [i. 1]). The exposition of the Law then follows in two sections. First come the biographies of the men who antedated the several written laws of the Torah, as Enos, Enoch, Noah, Abraham, Isaac, and Jacob. These were the Patriarchs, who were the living impersonations of the active law of virtue before there were any written laws.

Then the laws are discussed in detail: first the chief ten commandments (the Decalogue), and then the precepts in amplification of each law. The work is divided into the following treatises: 
"De Opificio Mundi" (comp. Siegfried in "Zeitschrift für Wissenschaftliche Theologie," 1874, pp. 562–565; L Cohn's important separate edition of this treatise, Breslau, 1889, preceded the edition of the same in "Philonis Alexandrini," etc., 1896, i.).
"De Abrahamo,"on Abraham, the representative of the virtue acquired by learning. The lives of Isaac and Jacob have been lost. The three patriarchs were intended as types of the ideal cosmopolitan condition of the world.
"De Josepho," the life of Joseph, intended to show how the wise man must act in the actually existing state.
"De Vita Mosis," books i.-iii.; Schürer, l.c. p. 523, combines the three books into two; but, as Massebieau shows (l.c. pp. 42 et seq.), a passage, though hardly an entire book, is missing at the end of the present second book (Wendland, in "Hermes," xxxi. 440). Schürer (l.c. pp. 515, 524) excludes this work here, although he admits that from a literary point of view it fits into this group; but he considers it foreign to the work in general, since Moses, unlike the Patriarchs, can not be conceived as a universally valid type of moral action, and can not be described as such. The latter point may be admitted. but the question still remains whether it is necessary to regard the matter in this light. It seems most natural to preface the discussion of the law with the biography of the legislator, while the transition from Joseph to the legislation, from the statesman who has nothing to do with the divine laws to the discussion of these laws themselves, is forced and abrupt. Moses, as the perfect man, unites in himself, in a way, all the faculties of the patriarchal types. His is the "most pure mind" ("De Mutatione Nominum," 37 [i. 610]), he is the "lover of virtue," who has been purified from all passions ("De Allegoriis Legum," iii. 45, 48 [i. 113, 115]). As the person awaiting the divine revelation, he is also specially fitted to announce it to others, after having received it in the form of the Commandments (ib. iii. 4 [i. 89 et seq.]).
"De Decalogo," the introductory treatise to the chief ten commandments of the Law.
"De Specialibus Legibus," in which treatise Philo attempts to systematize the several laws of the Torah, and to arrange them in conformity with the Ten Commandments. To the first and second commandments he adds the laws relating to priests and sacrifices; to the third (misuse of the name of God), the laws on oaths, vows, etc.; to the fourth (on the Sabbath), the laws on festivals; to the fifth (to honor father and mother),the laws on respect for parents, old age, etc.; to the sixth, the marriage laws; to the seventh, the civil and criminal laws; to the eighth, the laws on theft; to the ninth, the laws on truthful testifying; and to the tenth, the laws on lust. The first book includes the following treatises of the current editions: "De Circumcisione"; "De Monarchia," books i. and ii.; "De Sacerdotum Honoribus"; "De Victimis." On the division of the book into these sections, the titles of the latter, and newly found sections of the text, see Schürer, l.c. p. 517; Wendland, l.c. pp. 136 et seq. The second book includes in the editions a section also entitled "De Specialibus Legibus" (ii. 270–277), to which is added the treatise "De Septenario," which is, however, incomplete in Mangey. The greater part of the missing portion was supplied, under the title "De Cophini Festo et de Colendis Parentibus," by Mai (1818), and was printed in Richter's edition, v. 48–50, Leipsic, 1828. The complete text of the second book was published by Tischendorf in his "Philonea" (pp. 1–83). The third book is included under the title "De Specialibus Legibus" in ed. Mangey, ii. 299–334. The fourth book also is entitled "De Specialibus Legibus"; to it the last sections are added under the titles "De Judice" and "De Concupiscentia" in the usual editions; and they include, also, as appendix, the sections "De Justitia" and "De Creatione Principum." 
The treatises "De Fortitudine," "De Caritate," and "De Pœnitentia" are a kind of appendix to "De Specialibus Legibus." combines them into a special book, which, he thinks, was composed by Philo.
"De Præmiis et Pœnis" and "De Execratione." On the connection of both  This is the conclusion of the exposition of the Mosaic law.

This exposition is more exoteric than allegorical and might have been intended for gentile audiences.

Independent works 
"Quod Omnis Probus Liber," the second half of a work on the freedom of the just according to Stoic principles. The genuineness of this work has been disputed by Frankel (in "Monatsschrift," ii. 30 et seq., 61 et seq.), by Grätz ("Gesch." iii. 464 et seq.), and more recently by Ansfeld (1887), Hilgenfeld (in "Zeitschrift für Wissenschaftliche Theologie," 1888, pp. 49–71), and others. Now Wendland, Ohle, Schürer, Massebieau, and Krell consider it genuine, with the exception of the partly interpolated passages on the Essenes.
"In Flaccum" and "De Legatione ad Caium," an account of the Alexandrian persecution of the Jews under Caligula. This account, consisting originally of five books, has been preserved in fragments only (see Schürer, l.c. pp. 525 et seq.). Philo intended to show the fearful punishment meted out by God to the persecutors of the Jews (on Philo's predilection for similar discussions see Siegfried, "Philo von Alexandria," p. 157).
"De Providentia," preserved only in Armenian, and printed from Aucher's Latin translation in the editions of Richter and others (on Greek fragments of the work see Schürer, l.c. pp. 531 et seq.).
"De Animalibus" (on the title see Schürer, l.c. p. 532; in Richter's ed. viii. 101–144).
ϓποθετικά ("Counsels"), a work known only through fragments in Eusebius, Præparatio Evangelica, viii. 6, 7. The meaning of the title is open to discussion; it may be identical with the following
Περὶ Ἰουδαίων an apology for the Jews (Schürer, l.c. pp. 532 et seq.).

For a list of the lost works of Philo see Schürer, l.c. p. 534.

Other works ascribed to Philo

De Vita Contemplativa
This work describes the mode of life and the religious festivals of a society of Jewish ascetics, who according to the author, are widely scattered over the earth, and are found especially in every nome in Egypt. The writer, however, confines himself to describing the Therapeutae, a colony of hermits settled on the Lake Mareotis in Egypt, where each lives separately in his own dwelling. Six days of the week they spend in pious contemplation, chiefly in connection with Scripture. On the seventh day both men and women assemble together in a hall; and the leader delivers a discourse consisting of an allegorical interpretation of a Scriptural passage. The feast of the fiftieth day is especially celebrated. The ceremony begins with a frugal meal consisting of bread, salted vegetables, and water, during which a passage of Scripture is interpreted. After the meal the members of the society in turn sing religious songs of various kinds, to which the assembly answers with a refrain. The ceremony ends with a choral representation of the triumphal festival that Moses and Miriam arranged after the passage through the Red Sea, the voices of the men and the women uniting in a choral symphony until the sun rises. After a common morning prayer each goes home to resume his contemplation. Such is the contemplative life (βίος θεωρητικός) led by these Θεραπευταί ("servants of Yhwh").

The ancient Church looked upon these Therapeutæ as disguised Christian monks. This view has found advocates even in very recent times; Lucius' opinion particularly, that the Christian monkdom of the third century was here glorified in a Jewish disguise, was widely accepted ("Die Therapeuten," 1879). But the ritual of the society, which was entirely at variance with Christianity, disproves this view. The chief ceremony especially, the choral representation of the passage through the Red Sea, has no special significance for Christianity; nor have there ever been in the Christian Church nocturnal festivals celebrated by men and women together. 

Massebieau ("Revue de l'Histoire des Religions," 1887, xvi. 170 et seq., 284 et seq.), Conybeare ("Philo About the Contemplative Life," Oxford, 1895), and Wendland ("Die Therapeuten," etc., Leipsig, 1896) ascribe the entire work to Philo, basing their argument wholly on linguistic reasons, which seem sufficiently conclusive. But there are great dissimilarities between the fundamental conceptions of the author of the "De Vita Contemplativa" and those of Philo. The latter looks upon Greek culture and philosophy as allies, the former is hostile to Greek philosophy (see Siegfried in "Protestantische Kirchenzeitung," 1896, No.42). He repudiates a science that numbered among Its followers the sacred band of the Pythagoreans, inspired men like Parmenides, Empedocles, Zeno, Cleanthes, Heraclitus, and Plato, whom Philo prized ("Quod Omnis Probus," i., ii.; "Quis Rerum Divinarum Heres Sit," 43; "De Providentia," ii. 42, 48, etc.). He considers the symposium a detestable, common drinking-bout. This can not be explained as a Stoic diatribe; for in this case Philo would not have repeated it. And Philo would have been the last to interpret the Platonic Eros in the vulgar way in which it is explained in the "De Vita Contemplativa," 7 (ii. 480), as he repeatedly uses the myth of double man allegorically in his interpretation of Scripture ("De Opificio Mundi," 24; "De Allegoriis Legum," ii. 24). It must furthermore be remembered that Philo in none of his other works mentions these colonies of allegorizing ascetics, in which he would have been highly interested had he known of them. But pupils of Philo may subsequently have founded near Alexandria similar colonies that endeavored to realize his ideal of a pure life triumphing over the senses and passions; and they might also have been responsible for the one-sided development of certain of the master's principles. While Philo desired to renounce the lusts of this world, he held fast to the scientific culture of Hellenism, which the author of this book denounces. Although Philo liked to withdraw from the world in order to give himself up entirely to contemplation, and bitterly regretted the lack of such repose ("De Specialibus Legibus," 1 [ii. 299]), he did not abandon the work that was required of him by the welfare of his people.

Other
"De Incorruptibilitate Mundi." Jakob Bernays has argued convincingly that this work is spurious. Its Peripatetic basic idea that the world is eternal and indestructible contradicts all those Jewish teachings that were for Philo an indisputable presupposition. Bernays has proved at the same time that the text has been confused through wrong pagination, and he has cleverly restored it.
"De Mundo," a collection of extracts from Philo, especially from the preceding work
"De Sampsone" and "De Jona," in Armenian, published with Latin translation by Jean-Baptiste Aucher.
"Interpretatio Hebraicorum Nominum," a collection, by an anonymous Jew, of the Hebrew names occurring in Philo. Origen enlarged it by adding New Testament names; and Jerome revised it. On the etymology of names occurring in Philo's exegetical works see below.
A "Liber Antiquitatum Biblicarum," which was printed in the sixteenth century and then disappeared, has been discussed by Cohn in "J. Q. R." 1898, x. 277–332. It narrates Biblical history from Adam to Saul
The pseudo-Philonic "Breviarium Temporum," published by Annius of Viterbo

See also
Cairo Geniza
Elephantine papyri
Jewish temple at Elephantine
Land of Onias
Philo
Philosophy
Philo's view of God
Pseudo-Philo
Moses in rabbinic literature

References

 Kamesar, Adam, ed. (2009). The Cambridge Companion to Philo. Cambridge University Press, 2009. 
 Massebieau, Louis. Le classement des oeuvres de Philon. Extrait du tome I de la Bibliothèque de l'École des Hautes Études, Section des Sceicne religieuses. Paris: Ernest Leroux, 1889.
 Massebieau with posthumous editing by Émile Bréhier. "Essai sur la Chronologie de la Vie et des Œuvres de Philon". Revue de l'Histoire des Religions, ed. Jean Réville, vol. 53 (1906), pp. 25–64.
 Schürer, Emil. Geschichte des jüdischen Volkes im Zeitalter Jesu Christi (1886-1890)

External links
Works of Philo, with notes (Yonge 1854/55 Eng. transl.)
Works of Philo (Yonge 1854/55 Eng. transl.)
The Works Of Philo Judaeus Vol II (1854) (Yonge Eng. transl.)
The Works of Philo - searchable text from University of the Aegean  (site currently offline)
Works of Philo - searchable text 
Many (not all) works of Philo - searchable text 
Cohn & Wendland critical edition v1 (1896)
Cohn & Wendland critical edition v2 (1897)
Cohn & Wendland critical edition v3( 1898)
Cohn & Wendland critical edition v4 (1902)
Cohn & Wendland critical edition v5 (1906)

Ancient Roman philosophical literature
Jewish philosophy
Philosophy books
Philo